Diknu Schneeberger (born 17 January 1990 in Vienna) is an Austrian jazz guitarist in the tradition of gypsy jazz. In 2006 he received the Hans Koller Prize as Talent of the Year.

Biography 
Schneeberger is the son of the upright bassist Joschi Schneeberger. He had his first public appearance in June 2004 and in October the same year he released his first album with the Joschi Schneeberger Quintett. He first started guitar studies with Striglo Stöger, later with Martin Spitzer, now also a guitarist in Diknu Schneeberger Trio. His father Joschi Schneeberger is bassist in the trio.

Schneeberger also studied jazz guitar at the Vienna Conservatory.

Discography 
Joschi Schneeberger Quintett

 Rani (2004)

Diknu Schneeberger Trio

 Rubina (2007)
 The Spirit of Django (2010)
 Friends (2012)
 Feuerlicht (2018)
 Live From PORGY & BESS (2020)

Diknu Schneeberger

 Gypsy Rebel (2019)

References

External links 
 

Living people
1990 births
Austrian jazz guitarists
Male guitarists
21st-century guitarists
21st-century Austrian musicians